Pteris adscensionis is a fern species in the subfamily Pteridoideae of the family Pteridaceae. It is endemic to Ascension Island, and there are thought to be fewer than 500 individuals left in the wild.  Its natural habitat has been severely reduced due to the large number of species introduced to the island when it was first settled in the 18th century.

References

adscensionis
Flora of Ascension Island
Critically endangered plants
Taxonomy articles created by Polbot
Taxa named by Olof Swartz